Under the City's Sky is an Iranian Comedy series. The series is directed by Mehran Ghafourian. The series is made in three seasons.

About the series 
This series was make in 90 episodes after the end of the first season and due to the great reception, the second season was make in 42 episodes. But the third season with 90 episodes was not successful, so the fourth season was not make.

Storyline 
In this series, in the form of a humorous narrative, the lives of different strata of the city are depicted together. The whole story takes place from the beginning in an apartment where several neighbors live.

Cast 
 Mehran Ghafourian
 Hamid Lolayi
 Akbar Abdi
 Majid Salehi
 Kiumars Malekmotei
 Malakeh Ranjbar
 Parastoo Salehi
 Yousef Teymouri
 Kamran Malekmotei 
 Ashkan Eshtiyagh
 Aram Jafari
 Bijan Banafshehkhah
 Nasrollah Radesh
 Hasan Pourshirazi
 Akram Mohammadi
 Masoomeh Karimi
 Reza Zhian
 Mina Jafarzadeh
 Pourandokht Mahiman
 Reza Fayazi
 Reza Attaran
 Ali Ansarian
 Sanaz Samavati
 Borzou Arjmand
 Ghazal Saremi
 Pejman Bazeghi
 Ebrahim Abadi
 Gholamhussein Lotfi
 Behnoosh Bakhtiari
 Shahab Abbasi
 Mehdi Sabaei
 Mehri Mehrnia
 Mahmood Banafshehkhah
 Reza Banafshehkhah
 Sharareh Doroshti
 Mohsen Ghazi Moradi
 Shiva Boloorian
 Gholam Reza NikKhah
 Parviz Shafi Zadeh
 Amirhosein Modares
 Farahnaz Manafi Zaher
 Parvin Meykade
 Khashayar Rad
 Amir Ghaffarmanesh
 Ali Lakpourian
 Fakhreddin Seddigh Sharif
 Ramin Naser Nasir
 Siavash Mofidi
 Ramin Parchami
 Jafar Bozorgi
 Hassan Zare
 Mehran Zeighami
 Hossein Shahab
 Ramin Nemati
 Ali Osivand

References

External links
 

Iranian television series
2000s Iranian television series